Lyndale Avenue is a major street in the U.S. state of Minnesota that traverses the cities of Minneapolis, Brooklyn Center, Richfield, and Bloomington. A noncontiguous portion also exists in Faribault, part of Highway 21. There are several commercial districts along the street, including Lyn-Lake in South Minneapolis, Shops at Lyndale in Richfield, and the Oxboro area in Bloomington. Portions of both Interstate 94 and Interstate 35 run on the right-of-way of Lyndale Avenue.

Route description 

In Faribault, Lyndale Avenue is a divided four-lane highway with a 45 mph speed limit. Between Faribault and the Minnesota River, Lyndale Avenue has been replaced by Interstate 35. North of the river, the old Lyndale Avenue resumes in Bloomington. At the south edge of Bloomington, it is a 2-lane road, until 106th Street West. Through most of Bloomington and Richfield, it is an undivided four-lane city street. There are major commercial districts at 98th Street, American Boulevard, 77th Street (Kensington Park and Shops at Lyndale), and 66th Street (Woodlake Center). Shortly after entering Minneapolis, the street becomes a one-way, to connect with Minnesota State Highway 121, a freeway spur connecting Lyndale Ave and Interstate 35W. After their junction at 56th Street West, the road becomes a divided two-lane roadway across Minnehaha Creek and north toward Uptown. Near the intersection with Lake Street, it becomes a four-lane again, a major commercial street which remains continuous until the Virginia Triangle (the commons with Hennepin Avenue). After the Triangle, Lyndale Avenue splits, with matching one-ways on either side of Interstate 94. They join at Plymouth Avenue. The street remains four lanes until Broadway. The two-lane road ends at 57th Avenue North in Brooklyn Center, near the junction of I-94 and Interstate 694.

History 
The street was historically a rural route from Minneapolis to Faribault, though most of that route has since been replaced by Interstate 35 and I-35W. The Lyndale Avenue name is not signed on these routes.  From 1926 to 1934, U.S. Highway 65 traveled concurrently along Lyndale from the Minnesota–Iowa state line to Minneapolis and St.Paul via Northfield, where the road split to its various directions, later rejoining north of the downtowns and continuing north towards Littlefork. Again, the route was not always known as Lyndale Avenue, however.  This route also ran through the south metro cities of Lakeville, Burnsville, Bloomington, Richfield and along the east shoreline of Wood Lake before continuing into Minneapolis.  The modern portions of Lyndale Avenue is designated as County Road 22 (in Minneapolis) and Minnesota State Highway 21 (in Faribault). Prior to the portion south of Minneapolis being upgraded to a freeway, it was also part of Minnesota State Highway 65.  In addition, there is a brief location north of Interstate 35W where a short highway is signed as Minnesota State Highway 121, which follows the old US 65 route into south Minneapolis.

Lyndale Avenue takes its name from Lyndale Farm, a  farm owned by William S. King.  The name of the farm was in honor of King's father, Rev. Lyndon King, an itinerant Methodist minister of northern New York, who was named for Josiah Lyndon, colonial governor of Rhode Island in 1768-1769.

References 

Streets in Minneapolis
County roads in Hennepin County, Minnesota